The following is a list of Grammy Award winners and nominees by country:

Argentina
List of Argentine Grammy Award winners and nominees

Australia
List of Australian Grammy Award winners

Austria
List of Austrian Grammy Award winners and nominees

Azerbaijan

Barbados

Belgium

Brazil
List of Brazilian Grammy Award winners and nominees

Cameroon

Canada
List of Canadian Grammy Award winners and nominees

Cape Verde

Chile

China

Cuba
List of Cuban Grammy Award winners and nominees

France
List of French Grammy Award winners and nominees

Germany

Iceland

India
 List of Indian Grammy Award winners and nominees

Indonesia

Iran

Ireland
List of Irish Grammy Award winners and nominees

Italy
List of Italian Grammy Award winners and nominees

Japan
List of Japanese Grammy Award winners and nominees

Kazakhstan

Lebanon

Malaysia

Mali
List of Malian Grammy Award winners and nominees

Mexico
List of Mexican Grammy Award winners and nominees

Mongolia

Morocco

Nigeria
List of Nigerian Grammy Award winners and nominees

New Zealand
List of New Zealand Grammy Award winners and nominees

Peru

Philippines

Poland
List of Polish Grammy Award winners and nominees

Puerto Rico

Senegal
List of Senegalese Grammy Award winners and nominees

South Africa
List of South African Grammy Award winners and nominees

South Korea

Spain
List of Spanish Grammy Award winners and nominees

Sri Lanka

Taiwan

United Kingdom

United States

Vietnam

Notes

References